James Monroe (1758–1831) was the president of the United States from 1817 to 1825.

James Monroe may also refer to:
 Presidency of James Monroe, his presidency
 James Monroe (New York politician) (1799–1870), American congressman from New York, nephew of the president
 James Monroe (Michigan politician) (1816–1899), Michigan state representative
 James Monroe (Ohio politician) (1821–1898), American congressman from Ohio
 James H. Monroe (1944–1967), American soldier and Medal of Honor recipient
 James O. Monroe (1888-1968), American politician and newspaper editor
 James S. Monroe (1814–1884), American politician from Oregon
 James T. Monroe, American scholar and translator of Arabic
 James W. Monroe, U.S. Army general
 James Monroe, a character in the serial Ace of Spades
 James Monroe Taylor (1848–1916), president of Vassar College and Baptist minister

See also 
 The James Monroe, a residential skyscraper in Newport, Jersey City, New Jersey
 James Monro (1838–1920), lawyer and police commissioner
 James Munro (disambiguation)
 James Munroe (disambiguation)